The British Academy is a private, co-ed, primary and secondary school in Port of Spain, Trinidad and Tobago established in 2006. It is certificated by Cambridge Assessment International Education.

References

External links

Secondary schools in Trinidad and Tobago